The Stade Leburton is a multi-use stadium in Tubize, Belgium. It is currently used mostly for football matches and is the home ground of A.F.C. Tubize. The stadium holds 8,100 spectators.

References

External links
A.F.C. Tubize

Football venues in Wallonia
Sports venues in Walloon Brabant
Sport in Tubize